The National Soaring Museum (NSM) is an aviation museum whose stated aim is to preserve the history of motorless flight. It is located on top of Harris Hill near Elmira, New York, United States.

The NSM is the Soaring Society of America's official repository. In 1975, the SSA Board of Directors transferred the Soaring Hall of Fame to the National Soaring Museum.

The museum features a large collection of vintage and historical gliders.

The museum also administers the National Landmark of Soaring program to recognize people, places and events which are significant in the history of motorless aviation.

History

Elmira and Harris Hill have long been associated with soaring in the USA. The establishment of the nation's most prolific glider manufacturer, Schweizer Aircraft in Elmira and the holding of first 13 National Soaring Contests at the site between 1930 and 1946 guaranteed its stature as a location.

During the US National Soaring Contests in the 1950s competitors and organizers discussed the concept of a national soaring museum. A local Elmira museum at Strathmont Estates featured a display on the subject at the time.

In the 1960s, the gliding segment of this small collection was moved to Harris Hill as a result of the work of  the Harris Hill Soaring Corporation and Schweizer Aircraft co-founder Paul A. Schweizer.

By 1969 the Soaring Society of America had earmarked Harris Hill as the location for the future National Soaring Museum. The museum was established as an independent nonprofit corporation. The New York State Department of Education chartered the museum as a non-profit educational institution in 1972.

The museum replaced its original fire-damaged building in 1979 with a new  facility.

The presence of the NSM at Harris Hill was instrumental in convincing the National Warplane Museum, now called Wings of Eagles to move to the area in 1997. Along with the nearby Glenn H. Curtiss Museum in Hammondsport, New York, these three aviation history museums are major tourist draws to the Elmira region.

In 2013 the original Warren E. Eaton Motorless Flight Facility was listed on the National Register of Historic Places.

Collection

The NSM collection includes:

See also
List of aerospace museums
List of gliders
National Register of Historic Places listings in Chemung County, New York

References

External links
 National Soaring Museum website
 Detailed photographs of the NSM sailplane collection
Photos of sailplanes, gliders and other exhibits at the National Soaring Museum

Aerospace museums in New York (state)
Gliding in the United States
Museums established in 1969
1969 establishments in New York (state)
Museums in Chemung County, New York
Transportation buildings and structures on the National Register of Historic Places in New York (state)
National Register of Historic Places in Chemung County, New York
Airports on the National Register of Historic Places